The 2001 Niue Common Roll by-election was held in April 2001 to fill a vacant common roll seat in the Niue Assembly after assembly member Hima Douglas resigned to take an appointment as the Niue High Commission. Independent politician Hunuki Hunukitama won the election over an opponent in the Niue People's Party.

References

2001 elections in Oceania
2001 in Niue
By-elections to the Niue Assembly
Politics of Niue
April 2001 events in Oceania